Acrapex brunnea is a species of moth of the family Noctuidae first described by George Hampson in 1910. It is found in Africa, including Angola, Kenya and South Africa.

The wingspan is 20–30 mm.

Description 
Head and thorax dark brown slightly mixed with ochreous; thorax ochreous tinged with rufous; pectus and legs ochreous mixed with brown; abdomen ochreous suffused with brown. Forewing ochreous, the costal area suffused with red brown leaving slight pale streaks on the veins; a diffused brown streak along median nervure and thence to the subterminal oblique fascia, with two white points on it at lower angle of cell; a slight brown streak below base of cell; an oblique pale fascia from apex to discal fold with a diffused dark brown fascia below it from termen below apex to vein 3 with minute black streaks on it in the interspaces; a terminal series of slight black lunules; cilia ochreous mixed with brown and with brown line near base. Hindwing ochreous white, the veins and terminal area tinged with brown; a fine brown terminal line; cilia with a whitish with a slight brown line near base; the underside whitish with the costal and terminal areas sprinkled with reddish brown.

References

External links 

Xyleninae
Moths of Africa
Moths of Madagascar
Insects of Uganda
Insects of Angola
Insects of Zimbabwe
Moths described in 1910